Whitehall Township is a township with home rule status in Lehigh County, Pennsylvania. The township's population was 26,738 as of the 2010 census.

Whitehall Township is a suburb of Allentown in the Lehigh Valley metropolitan region, which had a population of 861,899 and was the 68th most populous metropolitan area in the U.S. as of the 2020 census. 

History

17th and 18th centuries

The province of Pennsylvania was created in 1681 when King Charles II granted a tract of land in America to William Penn. After the death of Penn, his sons, John, Thomas, and Richard, became the owners of Pennsylvania. The Lenape Indians deeded that part of Lehigh County lying between the Lehigh (South) Mountain and the Blue Mountains to Penn's sons in 1736.

A wave of immigrants from Germany's Palatinate settled in Whitehall Township, the first being Jacob Kohler, who settled in the vicinity of Egypt about 1728. The settlers staked their claim on the lands by applying to the Penns for a land warrant. They cleared the land for farming and established churches around which villages grew.

When the first European settlers came to the Whitehall area, the Lenape people were living on the banks of Hokendauqua Creek. The Europeans and the Lenape designed a deal to determine how much land the Europeans would acquire based on how far the Europeans were able to walk in two days. To gain more land, the Europeans paid a professional runner. The runner was able to get as far as what is now Coaldale, in Schuylkill County.

The Lenape lived peacefully among the German settlers for a time. But the tribe suffered injustices at the hands of the settlers and lashed back during a 1763 uprising in Lehigh County. Fort Deshler, which stood near Route 145 at Chestnut Street, played a key role in the defense of settler-held lands during this battle, in which 23 settlers were killed.

19th and 20th centuries

The original Whitehall Township, established in 1753, was split into the three townships of Whitehall, North Whitehall, and South Whitehall in 1867. The name Whitehall is said to have originated from Lynford Lardner's hunting lodge that was painted with whitewash. Lardner named it "Grouse Hall", but the common people of the region called it "White Hall". Whitehall Township's villages include Cementon, Egypt, Fullerton, Hokendauqua, Mickleys, Stiles, and West Catasauqua. Coplay was also part of Whitehall until it incorporated as a borough in 1869. Agriculture was the major industry until the mid-1800s. There were six grist mills in Whitehall, built to process grains for the farmers into flour and animal feed. Only one grist mill remains, the Helfrich Springs Grist Mill, which is also home to the Whitehall Historical Preservation Society, which has preserved the building for use as a local history museum.

Completion of the Lehigh Canal in 1829 led to further development. Discovery of iron ore deposits brought Whitehall into the Industrial Revolution when the first blast iron furnace was built in Hokendauqua in 1854. This was immediately followed by the establishment of a railroad system to transport raw materials to the furnaces and to ship the final product. Population grew rapidly as these industries attracted Welsh and Irish immigrants.

While the railroads were being constructed, cuts in the bedrock led to the discovery of Whitehall's deposits of Jacksonburg limestone. David O. Saylor perfected and patented the process of manufacturing Portland cement. The first Portland cement plant was located between the villages of Cementon and Coplay. Others quickly followed, and by 1914 70% of the cement produced in the United States came from the "Cement Belt" or Lehigh District. The cement industry attracted a new wave of immigrants from Austria-Hungary, creating yet another population spurt.

Whitehall became classified as a first class township with a population of 7,935 in 1900. This gave the township specified municipal rights for supplying electric lights, highways, and sewers at public expense. The post-World War II era began the transition from the manufacturing industries to the retail industry as Whitehall became a bedroom community and suburb of Allentown. The individual villages became united into one entity known as Whitehall in 1968, when the U.S. Post Office combined its separate town branches. Breadon Field, which was the home field for a series of Minor League Baseball teams from the stadium's 1948 opening until its 1964 demolition, was based in Whitehall Township. 

In 1974, voters approved the adoption of a Home Rule Charter form of government, creating a seven-member legislative body and an elected mayor. Today, with an annual budget in excess of $21 million, Whitehall provides a full range of municipal services to its residents.

Geography
Whitehall Township is in eastern Lehigh County on the north side of the city of Allentown. Whitehall is drained by the Lehigh River, which forms the eastern boundary of the township, separating it from the boroughs of Northampton and North Catasauqua in Northampton County and the borough of Catasauqua in Lehigh County.

The township was originally created on March 20, 1753, and included what is now North Whitehall and South Whitehall townships. In 1810, a petition was made to the Northampton County Court to split the township into two portions (at the time, the area now encompassed by Lehigh County was part of Northampton County). The name "Whitehall" refers to a white hall that was built along Jordan Creek in the early 1700s as a hunting lodge. The area had a large ruffed grouse population along with numerous white-tailed deer, eastern elk, eastern wolves, and black bear. Mountain lions or cougars may have also existed within Whitehall Township at some point in time. Because of the rich biodiversity of the area it became known as the wilderness of Whitehall. Old-growth forest consisting of oak, tulip poplar, hickory, black walnut, sugar maple, basswood, American chestnut, American beech, and sycamore covered the entire township.

In 1867, eastern portions of both North and South Whitehall were reapportioned into the current Whitehall Township. The new Whitehall Township is generally rectangular in shape, running from north-northwest to south-southeast, and is situated along the western bank of the Lehigh River.

The township's villages include Cementon, Eagle Point, Egypt, Fullerton, Hokendauqua, Mickleys, North Coplay, Scherersville (also in South Whitehall), Stiles, and West Catasauqua.

Adjacent municipalities
Catasauqua (east)
Hanover Township (southeast)
Allentown (south)
South Whitehall Township (southwest)
North Whitehall Township (northwest)
Allen Township, Northampton County (tangent to the northeast)
Northampton, Northampton County (northeast)
Coplay (east)
North Catasauqua, Northampton County (east)

Climate
Whitehall Township has a hot-summer humid continental climate (Dfa) and the hardiness zone is 6b.

Maps
 Official Township Zoning and Street Map 
 Township Boundary Map

Demographics

As of the census of 2010, there were 26,738 people, 10,376 households, and 6,817 families residing in the township.  The population density was 1,981.1 people per square mile (764.7/km2).  There were 10,744 housing units at an average density of 855.0 per square mile (330.0/km2).  The racial makeup of the township was 90.56% White, 2.74% African American, 0.13% Native American, 3.62% Asian, 0.06% Pacific Islander, 1.71% from other races, and 1.18% from two or more races. Hispanic or Latino of any race were 4.37% of the population.

There were 10,376 households, out of which 27.0% had children under the age of 18 living with them, 53.3% were married couples living together, 8.8% had a female householder with no husband present, and 34.3% were non-families. 28.6% of all households were made up of individuals, and 52% had someone living alone who was 65 years of age or older.  The average household size was 2.37 and the average family size was 2.93.

In the township, the population was spread out, with 21.2% under the age of 18, 7.3% from 18 to 24, 30.6% from 25 to 44, 22.7% from 45 to 64, and 18.1% who were 65 years of age or older.  The median age was 40 years. For every 100 females, there were 92.0 males.  For every 100 females age 18 and over, there were 89.3 males. The median income for a household in the township was $43,070, and the median income for a family was $51,597. Males had a median income of $39,175 versus $26,933 for females. The per capita income for the township was $21,383.  About 4.4% of families and 6.5% of the population were below the poverty line, including 8.7% of those under age 18 and 7.0% of those age 65 or over.

Education
Whitehall-Coplay School District serves the township and also the borough of Coplay. Students in grades 9–12 from both municipalities attend Whitehall High School.

There also are several parochial and private schools within the Township:
Good Shepherd Catholic School (K-8)
Lehigh Valley Lutheran School (K-8)
Lehigh Valley Seventh-day Adventist School (K-8)
St. Elizabeth Regional School (K-8)
St. Stephens School (PK-K)
Manarah Islamic Academy (PK-5)

Historic sites
The Dent Hardware Company Factory Complex in Fullerton and Helfrich's Springs Grist Mill in the township are listed on the National Register of Historic Places.

Businesses
The Lehigh Valley Mall, the largest Lehigh Valley-based shopping mall, is located in Whitehall Township, as is the Whitehall Mall.

Several radio stations have broadcast facilities within the township (all owned by iHeartMedia), including:

 WAEB (AM) (790 AM), Talk radio
 WAEB (FM) (104.1 FM), Top 40
 WSAN (1470 AM), Sports radio
 WZZO (95.1 FM), Rock music

Government
Whitehall Township operates as a First Class Township.  On November 5, 1974, the township adopted a Home Rule Charter (here) form of government that became effective January 5, 1976.

As part of this governmental arrangement, the Township has separate executive and legislative branches.  The legislative branch consists of a Township Board of Commissioners of seven (7) members, each serving 4-year terms.  Four of the seats have terms that overlap the remaining three seat terms (e.g. four of the current terms end in 2007, while the remaining 3 terms end in 2009).  The seated members then elect a President and Vice President who conduct Board meetings.

The executive branch consists of a Mayor, who also serves a 4-year term.  The Mayor may appoint a Deputy Mayor at his/her discretion, with approval from the Board of Commissioners.  The Deputy Mayor does not automatically become Mayor should the standing Mayor leave office for any reason—a replacement is to be appointed by the Board of Commissioners.

Whitehall Township also maintains an elected Treasurer who serves a four-year term.

Current officials

Township

Mayor
Michael P. Harakal Jr. (D); term January 2020 to Dec 2023.

Township treasurer
Colleen Gober 2019-2011 (D); Township Compensation $35,919.30 {2014}, $36,278.49 (2015) $37,004.06 (2016) $$37,374.10 (2017);This does not include compensation from the Whitehall Coplay School District

Township commissioners 
Phillip J. Ginder, President Term 2019-2023 (D; $4,125); 
Joseph J. Marx Jr., Vice President Term 2017-2021 (D;$4,125); 
Thomas Slonaker, Secretary Term 2017-2021 (D;$4,125); 
Randy Atiyeh Term 2019-2023 (D; $4,125);
Michael Dee, Term 2020-2021 (D:$4,125); 
Charles G. Fisher, Term 2019-2023 (D;$4,125); 
Jeffrey Warren Term 2019-2023 (D;$4,125);

Lehigh County

County executive
Phillips Armstrong (D; $75,000); 2018-2021

County commissioners
1st County District, Marc Grammes
2nd County District, Percy Dougherty
3rd County District, Amy Zanelli
4th County District, Geoff Brace
5th County District, Nathan Brown
At Large
Bob Elbich
Dave Harrington
Dan Hartzell
Zakiya Smalls

Pennsylvania

Senate
18th State Senatorial District: Lisa Boscola (D; $85,536); 2013-2018 (District map)

State House
133rd State Legislative District
Jeanne McNeill (D; $87,180); 2017-2018
Whitehall Districts: 2–6, 8–9 (plus others outside Whitehall)
183rd State Legislative District
Zach Mako (R; $87,180); 2017-2018
Whitehall Districts: 1, 7, 10–12 (plus others outside Whitehall)

Federal

Senate
Senior Senator: Bob Casey, Jr. (D; $174,000); 2024
Junior Senator: John Fetterman (D; $174,000); 2028

House
7th District of Pennsylvania: Susan Wild (D; $174,000); 2020 (District map)

Sources
League of Women Voters of the Lehigh Valley
Lehigh County Web Site

Transportation

The township's main north–south road is MacArthur Road (PA 145), which has an interchange with US 22 in the south and crosses PA 329 in the north. PA 145 heads south into Allentown and north to Walnutport. US 22 passes east–west through the southern portion of Whitehall Township on a freeway called the Lehigh Valley Thruway, with interchanges at PA 145 and Fullerton Avenue. US 22 leads west to connections with PA 309, I-476 (Pennsylvania Turnpike Northeast Extension), and I-78 and east to Bethlehem and Easton. PA 329 passes east–west through the northern portion of Whitehall Township on Main Street, leading west to Schnecksville and east to Northampton and Bath.

LANta provides bus service in Whitehall Township, with several routes serving the MacArthur Road retail corridor and a transfer center located at the Lehigh Valley Mall. The bus routes connect the township with Allentown, Bethlehem, and other points in the Lehigh Valley.

Notable people
 Afa Anoa'i, former professional wrestler, "The Wild Samoans"
 Saquon Barkley, professional football player, New York Giants
 Brian Knobbs, former professional wrestler
 Dan Koppen, former professional football player, Denver Broncos and New England Patriots
 Patrick Maggitti, first provost of Villanova University and dean of the Villanova School of Business
 Matt Millen, former professional football player, Oakland Raiders, San Francisco 49ers and Washington Redskins, former president and General Manager, Detroit Lions
 Jerry Sags, former professional wrestler
 Curt Simmons, former professional baseball player, California Angels, Chicago Cubs, Philadelphia Phillies, and St. Louis Cardinals

References

External links

 Whitehall news at The Morning Call

Populated places on the Lehigh River
Townships in Lehigh County, Pennsylvania
Townships in Pennsylvania